Hubert Noël (1924–1987) was a French film actor.

Partial filmography

 Forbidden to the Public (1949) - Bernard
 Dear Caroline (1951) - L'ami de Sallanches (uncredited)
 Monsieur Fabre (1951) - Le fiancé d'Antonia
 Crimson Curtain (1952)
 The Earrings of Madame de... (1953) - Henri de Maleville
 Le Chevalier de la nuit (1953) - L'amoureux
 Royal Affairs in Versailles (1954) - Un jeune seigneur (uncredited)
 The Secret of Helene Marimon (1954) - Un soldat
 The Red and the Black (1954)
 If Paris Were Told to Us (1956) - Un passant
 Marie Antoinette Queen of France (1956) - Un ami de Fersen (uncredited)
 La Traversée de Paris (1956) - Le gigolo arrêté (uncredited)
 Nathalie (1957) - Serge Lambert
 That Night (1958) - Gérald Martin
 Le Bossu (1959) - Philippe de Nevers
 Magnificent Sinner (1959) - Michel Dolgorouki
 Le bel âge (1960) - Hubert
 The Enemy General (1960) - Claude
 Coctail party (1960) - Pierre
 Boulevard (1960) - Le maquereau
 La morte-saison des amours (1961) - Hubert
 Le Miracle des loups (1961) - Narrator (uncredited)
 Famous Love Affairs (1961) - Eric (segment "Agnès Bernauer")
 The Devil and the Ten Commandments (1962) - L'amant de Clarisse (segment "Tes père et mère honoreras")
 Don't Tempt the Devil (1963) - L'amant de Catherine
 Devils of Darkness (1965) - Count Sinistre aka Armond du Molier
 Un mari à prix fixe (1965) - Norbert Besson
 Trap for Cinderella (1965) - François
 The Man from Interpol (1966) - Alec Suller
 Triple Cross (1966) - Von Runstedt's Aide de Camp
 The Little Girl Who Lives Down the Lane (1976) - Bank Clerk
 The Late Blossom (Le soleil se lève en retard) (1977)
 Cathy's Curse (1977) - Le docteur
 Panic (Panique) (1977)
 The Gypsy Warriors (1978) - Henry Deseau
 Madame Claude 2 (1981) - Gérald
 Les Misérables (1982) - Lafayette
 Stress (1984) - Client blessé
 American Dreamer (1984) - Doctor At Nightclub

References

Bibliography
 Brian McFarlane. Lance Comfort. Manchester University Press, 1999.

External links

1924 births
1987 deaths
French male film actors
French male television actors
Male actors from Le Havre